Västanfors is a district (stadsdel) of Fagersta and is located in Fagersta Municipality, Sweden.

Notable People From Västanfors 
 Anitra Steen, Swedish civil servant, politician, and spouse of Sweden's former prime minister Göran Persson.
 Rune Lindström, Swedish screenwriter and actor.
 Lennart Hellsing, Swedish write and translator.

Populated places in Västmanland County